The Awit Awards are music awards in the Philippines given annually by the Philippine Association of the Record Industry (PARI) to recognize the outstanding achievements in the music industry. The word "Awit" means "song" literally in Filipino.

The first awards were given in 1969 at a ceremony in Makati. After three awards ceremonies were held, the Awit Awards were discontinued in 1972. In 1988, PARI brought back the awards and today, the organization still handles these awards.

History
The idea for Awit Awards was conceived by Oskar "Oskee" Salazar, the Billboard correspondent for the Philippines at that time, in  late 1968. The first awards ceremony was held on March 23, 1969, that took place in Makati. It was organized by the Awit Awards Executive Committee, which composed of representatives from different record companies, with Salazar as their chairman. Winners were voted by a jury composed of 15 people which were selected by the Awit Awards Executive Committee. The jurors were chosen by their jobs in the music industry such as a record retailer, jukebox operator, entertainment/music writer or a radio station program director.

Days before the second awards, they decided to create a formal academy called the Philippine Academy of Recording Arts and Sciences (PARAS), replacing the Awit Awards Executive Committee. The academy was headed by Danny Villanueva, the outgoing president of the Filipino Academy of Movie Arts and Sciences (FAMAS), as the chairman alongside Salazar as the co-chairman. It was composed of 75 members. The second awards was held in July 1970 while the third happened in June 1971. These two ceremonies were administered by the academy. From 1972 until 1987, no Awit Awards ceremonies were held.

In 1988, the Philippine Association of the Record Industry resurrected the Awit Awards. Instead of following the previous numbering pattern, they decided to call the 1988 awards as the 1st Awit Awards. This pattern continued until now.

Nomination process
Any recording company which is a member of the PARI can submit entries for Awit Awards. A non-member recording company can qualify if it has a business arrangement with a PARI member such as licensing, distributing and marketing. The entries that could be submitted are based on the eligibility period when the music was released. The eligibility period is always from January 1 to December 31 of the previous year. Nominations may only be awarded to any person with Filipino heritage, resident or non-resident of the Philippines. Foreigners must show documents certifying their Filipino heritage.

All entries would be then screened by judges. The jury comprises radio personnel, entertainment journalists, television personalities, composers, brand/marketing professionals and musicians. For the technical achievement categories, judges could either be a sound/vocal/musical engineer, television commercial producer, film director or someone from the media. The judges would vote on all entries and the five highest scoring entries would become the nominees for each category. A category could have more than 5 nominees if there's a tie.

Nominees in each category would go through another voting round with the highest scoring finalists would be then  declare as the winners in the awards night.

Currently, the ballots are audited by the Isla Lipana & Co., a Philippine member firm of the PricewaterhouseCoopers.

Ceremonies

1969-1971 
Presented by the Awit Awards Executive Committee and the Philippine Academy of Recording Arts and Sciences

1988-1999 
Presented by the Philippine Association of the Record Industry

2000s

2010s

2020s

Categories

Performance Awards

Best Performance by a Female Recording Artist
Best Performance by a Male Recording Artist
Best Performance by a Group Recording Artists
Best Performance by a New Female Recording Artist
Best Performance by a New Male Recording Artist
Best Performance by a New Group Recording Artists
Best Performance by a Child/Children Recording Artist/s
Best Collaboration

Creativity Awards

Album of the Year
Song of the Year
Best Selling Album of the Year
Best Ballad Recording
Best Rock/Alternative Recording
Best World Music Recording
Best Novelty Recording
Best Dance Recording
Best Inspirational/Religious Recording
Best Christmas Recording
Best Rap Recording
Best Jazz Recording
Best R&B Recording
Best Regional Recording
Best Song Written for Movie/TV/Stage Play

Technical Achievement Awards

Best Musical Arrangement 
Best Vocal Arrangement
Best Engineered Recording
Best Album Package
Music Video of the Year

Digital Awards

Most Downloaded Song
Most Downloaded Artist

People's Choice Awards

People's Choice Favorite Female Recording Artist
People's Choice Favorite Male Recording Artist
People's Choice Favorite Group Recording Artists

Special Awards

Dangal ng Musikang Pilipino Award
International Achievement Award

See also
 Philippine Association of the Record Industry
 Awit Awards List of Winners

References

External links
 Official Website of the Awit Awards

Awit Awards
Philippine music awards
Awards established in 1969
1969 establishments in the Philippines
Award ceremonies in the Philippines